Ronald Henry Willson (14 July 1933 – 3 January 2017) was a former English-born Zimbabwean cricketer. Willson was a left-handed batsman who bowled slow left-arm orthodox. He was born in Seaford, Sussex.

Willson made his first-class debut for Sussex in 1955 against Oxford University, having previously played for the Sussex Second XI and the Kent Second XI. He played first-class cricket for Sussex on 19 occasions between 1955 and 1957. In these 19 matches he scored 395 runs at a batting average of 15.19, with a single century high score of 113*. Willson did not represent Sussex after 1957, but did represent Devon in a single Minor Counties Championship match in 1959 against Dorset. He later played first-class cricket for Rhodesia, making his debut for the team against Transvaal in 1961. He played two further first-class fixtures the following season, both against a touring International XI.

Willson died in Harare, Zimbabwe on 3 January 2017, aged 83.

References

External links
Ronald Willson at ESPNcricinfo
Ronald Willson at CricketArchive

1933 births
2017 deaths
People from Seaford, East Sussex
English cricketers
Sussex cricketers
Devon cricketers
Zimbabwean cricketers
Rhodesia cricketers